Allergin may refer to:

 Allergen
 Diphenhydramine, known by the trade name Allergin